Moussa Sagna Fall (born 31 December 1959) is a retired Senegalese high jumper.

Regionally he won a bronze medal at the 1979 African Championships, and then gold at the 1982 and 1985 African Championships. He also competed at the 1980 Olympic Games and the 1983 World Championships without reaching the final.

His personal best jump was 2.26 metres (1982). This is the Senegalese record.

References

1959 births
Living people
Senegalese male high jumpers
Olympic athletes of Senegal
Athletes (track and field) at the 1980 Summer Olympics
World Athletics Championships athletes for Senegal